John Floreani (born 27 December 1991) is an Australian singer and musician, best known as the vocalist of punk rock band, Trophy Eyes. He also releases music under his own name (formerly Little Brother). He is signed by Hopeless Records.

Career

Solo career 
After writing songs that were not the right fit for Trophy Eyes, Floreani created the acoustic music project, Little Brother. He released his first album Terrace in November 2014, made up of five tracks. He later released a single title "Cleveland, Oh" in 2016, and a full-length album titled sin in 2019.

Discography

Trophy Eyes discography 

 Mend, Move On (2014)
 Chemical Miracle (2016)
 The American Dream (Trophy Eyes album) (2018)

Solo discography 

 Terrace (2014)
 sin (2019)

Singles featured on

References 

Living people

1991 births
People from Mudgee
21st-century Australian male singers